Mahavir Shah (5 April 1960 – 31 August 2000) was a noted Indian television and stage actor who worked in Hindi and Gujarati movies. He is remembered for portraying several villainous roles. He died in a car crash in 2000, when he was in the United States during a two-month holiday tour.

Life
Shah was born on 5 April 1960 in Bombay (now Mumbai). He gained interest in acting since his childhood.Mahavir Shah (born on 05 April 1960 in Bombay, Bombay State, India) was Indian actor worked in Hindi and Gujrati movie, TV shows. He was born in Gujarati Hindu family. He was mainly known for his work in Police Aur Mujrim (1992), Baadshah (1999), and Yes Boss (1997). He married Chetna Shah. This couple has one daughter and one son. He was mainly known for his work in villain roles. He started his career as a stage actor and worked in several plays. He made his Hindi movie debut with Ab Kya Hoga (1977). He made his TV debut with Zee Horror Show (1993-2001). Mahavir played police and lawyer character roles in several movies. He played mainly small roles in movies. He never got big/important roles. But with his talent, he played small roles and got recognization. Mahavir Shah worked in more than 86+ movies and 02 TV shows. Aaj Ka Andha Kanoon (2003) was his last acted movie. On 31 August 2000 will he was on a tour for a performance in the US along with his wife, son, and daughter in Chicago, United States their car with all family collide with another car. Luckily all four (Mahavir, his wife, daughter, son) survived but when Mahavir came out of the car suddenly another running car on road collides with him and he died. Mahavir Shah will be always remembered in every heart and memories of his fans.

Death
On 31 August 2000, when Shah was in the U.S. during his two-month holiday tour, he died in a car crash. He is remembered for his several villainous roles and his TV shows.

Selected filmography

1976: Bhala Manus as Candidate
1977: Ab Kya Hoga as Driver
1978: Jhoota Kahin Ka as the mechanic
1981: Harjaee as Ajay's friend
1982: Gandhi as Police Constable (Cameo Appearance) (uncredited)
1983: Be Aabroo
1983: Sampoorna Mahabharat as Guest at Draupadi's Swayamvar
1983: Aao Pyaar Karen
1984: Bhavna as Balwant
1985: Yudh Defence Lawyer
1986: Badkaar as Mahavir - Hero
1986: Ankush as Gupta
1987: Rajlakshmi as Rajkumar
1988: Khoon Bahaa Ganga Mein
1988: Dayavan as Chokshi
1988: Tezaab Is Acid as Inspector Gupta
1988: Aakhri Adaalat as Girdhar (Bansidhar's nephew)
1988: Paap Ka Anth as Vikram
1989:Khoon Bahaa Ganga Mein
1990: Prakope
1990: Azaad Desh Ke Gulam as Vicky
1990: Police Public as Inspector Khera
1990: Chor Pe Mor
1990: Thanedaar as Killer
1990: Baaghi: A Rebel for Love as Balbir (uncredited)
1990: Apmaan Ki Aag as Inspector Damodar
1990: Zakhmi Zameen as Chotey Thakur
1990: Mera Pati Sirf Mera Hai as Prakash as M. Verma
1990: Ghar Ho To Aisa as Prince of Palghat
1991: Benaam Badsha as Inspector Satyaprakash Verma
1991: 100 Days as Mr. Mathur
1991: Banjaran as Thakur Mahavir Singh
1991: Jeevan Daata as Masterji
1991: Narasimha as Jailor Shinde
1991: Inspector as Dhanush
1992: Jawani Janeman
1992: Binani
1992: Shola Aur Shabnam as Inspector Tiwari
1992: Humshakal as Mr. Ajay
1992: Tirangaa as Jailor
1992: Police Aur Mujrim as Sanga
1993: Game as Peter D'Souza
1993: Kundan as Inspector Sawant
1993: Bhookamp as Mahesh Shah
1993: Shaktiman as Chhotey
1993: Antim Nyay as Munna (as Mahaveer Shah)
1993: Phool Aur Angaar as Inspector Arvind Phadke
1993: Gurudev Mahavir as (Bhola's brother)
1993: Aadmi as Inspector Khatre
1993: Pehchaan as Yogi's henchman
1993: Parwane as Drunkard
1993: Zakhmo Ka Hisaab as Dhaneshwar's son
1993: Jeevan Ki Shatranj as Press Photographer
1993: Aankhen as Pravin Shah
1994: Aa Gale Lag Jaa as Truck driver
1994: Zid as Sajju
1994: Raja Babu as Inspector (uncredited)
1994: Janam Se Pehle as Ramesh's Father
1994: Jai Kishen as Chhote Bhai
1994: Mr. Azaad as Police Inspector D.Lal (uncredited)
1995: Guneghar as Noorudin "Noora"
1995: Zakhmi Sipahi as Rajesh
1995: Coolie No. 1 as Gajendra's manager
1995: Aatank Hi Aatank as Aslam's Cousin
1995: Hum Dono as Surendra Nath Gupta
1995: Dushmani: A Violent Love Story as Inspector (uncredited)
1996: Mr. Bechara as Anita's Brother
1996: Sapoot as Kranti
1997: Ganga Maange Khoon
1997: Judwaa as Inspector Sharma
1997: Yes Boss as Shukla
1997: Judge Mujrim as Defending Lawyer
1997: Bhai Bhai as Major Balwant (uncredited)
1998: Barood Ke Sholay
1998: Saazish
1998: Salaakhen as ACP Kamble
1998: Gharwali Baharwali
1998: Sar Utha Ke Jiyo
1998: Bade Miyan Chote Miyan as Zorawar's Client
1998: Mehndi as Ankush Chaudhary
1998: Hatya Kaand as advocate
1999: Lo Main Aa Gaya
1999: Kachche Dhaage as Advocate Chinoy
1999: Haseena Maan Jaayegi as Goa Police Inspector
1999: Baadshah as Police Officer
2000: Heerabai
2000: Phir Bhi Dil Hai Hindustani as Madanlal Gupta
2000: Papa The Great as Police Inspector
2000: Bichhoo
2000: Tera Jadoo Chal Gayaa
2001: Jagira
2001: Kyo Kii... Main Jhuth Nahin Bolta as Public Prosecutor #2
2002: City Girl' S Hostel
2002: 23 March 1931 as Shaheed
2002: Guru Mahaaguru
2002: Ek Aur Visphot as D.S.P. Rastogi
2003: Aaj Ka Andha Kanoon as Shiva
2007: Aakheer (video) as Inspector Nagpal (final film role)

Television

References

External links

1948 births
2000 deaths
Indian male film actors
Indian male television actors
Road incident deaths in Illinois
Male actors from Mumbai
20th-century Indian male actors
Male actors in Hindi cinema